Anil Parab (born 1974) is an Indian politician affiliated with the Shiv Sena party. A local of Mumbai, Maharashtra, Parab served as the Transport & Parliamentary Affairs Minister of Maharashtra from 2019 until 2022. Mr. Parab faces severe charges of corruption and has been raided at 14 places by Enforcement Directorate.  He has been exposed in huge corruption by collecting haftas from many people, extorting money and taking money for transfers, a 100 crore scam. Parab is known as a collector and agent to collect the money by extortion as per the complaint filed and cases registered against him by several government agencies.

Positions held
 2012: Elected to Maharashtra Legislative Council
 2017: Appointed Shiv Sena group leader in Maharashtra Legislative Council
 2018: Elected to Maharashtra Legislative Council
 2019: Appointed minister of Transport and Parliamentary Affairs
 2020: Appointed guardian minister of Ratnagiri district

Career
Parab started his career as a cable operator and started cable business. He used to handle an autorickshaw union.
He is accused of building a Sai Resort at Dapoli in the name of a cable operator through money earned by extortion and corrupt money. Enforcement Directorate has registered a case for building this resort through money laundering.

 Mr Kirit Somaiya has registered a case with allegations of forgery, cheating and violation of rules.

Criticism
Sachin Vaze, alleged that other than Nationalist Congress Party (NCP) leader Anil Deshmukh, he received "time to time instructions" from the Maharashtra Transport Minister and Shiv Sena leader, Anil Parab, to collect bribes.

The Enforcement Directorate has summoned Anil Parab for questioning on 28 September 2021, while probing a money laundering case. This will be the second time, Parab has been summoned after he was summoned on 31 August 2021, for which he sought some time, citing some commitments as a public servant and minister of state of Maharashtra.
Enforcement Directorate has conducted raids on residences and offices of Minister Mr. Anil Parab on charges of money laundering and corruption. It is said that he has been helped by Mr. Bajrang Kharmate, a deputy RTO, in money laundering and corruption in transfer scam. Enforcement directorate had already conducted raids on Mr. Bajrang Kharmate.
Parab's name also cropped up when former Mumbai police officer Sachin Waze accused Parab of receiving kickbacks worth crores for the transfer of 10 police officers. The minister has been under the scanner after Waze, in a letter he tried to submit to a National Investigation Agency (NIA) court, claimed that Parab had asked him to extort Rs 50 crore from a private trust. Waze also alleged that Parab told him to look into an inquiry against the fraudulent contractors listed in the BMC and asked him to collect “at least Rs 2 crore” from about 50 such contractors.
Mr. Bajarang Kharmate has been a Deputy RTO officer who has been the agent to collect all the money and distribute it between Transport Commissioner Mr. Avinash Dhakne and Minister Mr. Anil Parab. Mr. Kharmate was also raided by Enforcement Directorate. Mr. Kharmate has been involved in money laundering case along with Mr. Anil Parab.
Parab has formed a group of Kharmate and Transport Commissioner Avinash Dhakne and this group has been considered as a pioneer of corruption.
Kharmate got all illegal promotions with wrong deem dates. He is mastermind in deem date scam. He now wants another deem date promotion. It's a deem date scam. Minister Anil Parab wants to please him because he has given lots of money to the minister.
Nashik RTO Bharat Kalaskar works as an agent and collects money on behalf of Avinash Dhakne. Bajrang Kharmate collects money for Minister Anil Parab and Commissioner Dhakne. Jitendra Patil is another important cog in the wheel.
Kharmate has already deposited funds in the order of 200 crores for 2021 this year on behalf of Anil Parab and Avinash Dhakne. Money has been disbursed between these officers and the minister.
Nashik RTO Bharat Kalaskar works as an agent and collects money on behalf of Avinash Dhakne. Bajrang Khamate collected money to cover minister Anil Parab and the commissioner. Jitendra Patil, Deputy Transport Commissioner, is another important party in the wheel.
Kharmate has received all illegal promotions with an incorrect mental date. He is involved in the Deem Date scam. Now he wants another Deem Date promotion. Mr. Anil Parab wants to please Kharmate with deem date promotion as he has given a lot of money to the minister.
An inspector Gajanan Patil launched a complaint against Parab, Kharmate, Dhakne and in Enforcement Directorate for a lot of corruption and filed a case in high court to mention that these three are pioneers of corruption in Maharashtra.

Kharmate gained promotion through illegal means and earned huge wealth. Apart from their 2 bungalows in Pune, they have 4 LG showrooms and two jewellery showrooms in Pune, 100 acres of land with the help of Parab and Dhakne. He is also the owner of Tanishq Jewellery franchise in Indore.
Bharat Kalaskar gets 35 lakhs per month, he gets Rs 50 lakhs for the additional charge. But despite this, his greater greed led to many false accusations against his colleagues and junior officers.

The Enforcement Directorate (ED) has summoned Shiv Sena leader and Transport Minister Anil Parab for questioning in connection to a money laundering case on 15 June 2022 and his links with corrupt officer Kharmate.
Parab is also facing some other charges of alleged irregularities and corruption.
The federal agency wants to question and record Parab's statement under the Prevention of Money Laundering Act (PMLA), they said.

References

External links
 Shivsena Home Page
 http://abpmajha.abplive.in/mumbai/anil-parab-hero-of-shivsena-victory-22802

Living people
Place of birth missing (living people)
Politicians from Mumbai
Shiv Sena politicians
Maharashtra MLAs 2019–2024
Prisoners and detainees of India
1974 births